Avatrombopag, sold under the brand name Doptelet,  is a medication that used for certain conditions that lead to thrombocytopenia (low platelets) such as thrombocytopenia associated with chronic liver disease in adults who are to undergo a planned medical or dental procedure. It was approved for medical use in the United States in May 2018, the European Union in June 2019, and Australia in January 2023.

It acts as a thrombopoietin receptor agonist.

References

External links
 

Drugs acting on the blood and blood forming organs
Orphan drugs
Thrombopoietin receptor agonists
Thiophenes
Chloropyridines
Thiazoles
Piperazines